Francis Charles Bowen Wedgwood, 2nd Baron Wedgwood of Barlaston (20 January 1898 – 22 April 1959) was a British artist and hereditary peer.

Biography 
The son of Josiah Wedgwood, 1st Baron Wedgwood and his wife Ethel Kate Bowen, the daughter of Charles Bowen, 1st Baron Bowen.  He was the great-great-great-grandson of the potter Josiah Wedgwood.  He was educated at Bedales School.  During the First World War he served as an officer in the Royal Navy Volunteer Reserve and later the Royal Flying Corps.  After the war, in 1920, he married Edith May Telfer, daughter of William Telfer of Glasgow.  They had one son, The Hon. Hugh Wedgwood (born 1921), later 3rd Baron Wedgwood.  Wedgwood studied at the Burslem School of Art (1920–1922), and the Slade School of Art (1922–1925).  He exhibited at the New English Art Club, (1927–1930) and Royal Academy (1931–1939).  Upon the death of his father in 1943, he became the 2nd Baron Wedgwood.  Upon his own death in 1959, the title passed to his only son, Hugh Wedgwood, 3rd Baron Wedgwood.

References

 'WEDGWOOD', Who Was Who, A & C Black, 1920–2008; online edn, Oxford University Press, Dec 2007 accessed 26 Dec 2010

Wedgwood, Francis Charles, 2nd Baron
Wedgwood, Francis Charles, 2nd Baron
Wedgwood, Francis Charles Bowen Wedgwood, 2nd Baron
Wedgwood, Francis Charles, 2nd Baron